The 2017–18 SuperLiga (also known as the CEC Bank SuperLiga for sponsorship reasons) is the 104th season of premier club rugby in Romania. The current champions are Timișoara Saracens who managed to defend their title by defeating Știința Baia Mare. Since Politehnica Iași have faced financial issues, they will relegate to Divizia Națională de Seniori which means that both Tomitanii Constanța and Gloria Buzău will replace them next season. Also Timișoara Saracens, the winners of the CEC Bank SuperLiga will participate in the European Rugby Continental Shield.

Teams

Table
This is the regular season league table: 
{| class="wikitable" style="text-align: left;"
|-
!colspan=2|Key to colours
|-
| style="background: #d0f0c0;" |     
|Advances to Semi-Finals.
|-
| style="background: #ffcccc;" |     
|Relegates to Divizia Naţională de Seniori. 
|}

 Semifinals
The semi-finals were held on 19 May 2018.

Knock-out Stage
 Third place final
Both finals were held on 26 May 2018, one week after the semi-finals.

 First place final

External links
  www.super-liga.ro  – Official website

References 

SuperLiga (rugby)
Romania
2017–18 in Romanian rugby union